Black Horse Drove is a linear hamlet that lies  north-north-east of Ely in Cambridgeshire, England in the civil parish of Littleport .  Black Horse Drove is located off the Ten Mile Bank, a long road which runs alongside the north-western bank of the river Great Ouse between Littleport and Southery in Norfolk.

The estimated population of Black Horse Drove in 2010 was 220 in 93 dwellings.

Facilities
A Wesleyan chapel was built in 1843 and rebuilt in 1897 but it has now been converted to a private residence.

A school was built in Black Horse Drove c.1874 but due to overcrowding and its dangerous condition, a new school called the Coronation County Primary Junior and Infants School was built in 1937.  The old school was used as a community centre until 2008 when it was acquired by Littleport Parish Council and then refurbished.  The community centre re-opened on 15 October 2011.

The Black Horse public house was built  c.1912 but has closed and is now a private residence.

In Black Horse Drove there is also a children's play area and a playing field.

Transport
There is a weekly bus service on Thursday mornings which leaves at 09:30 to Littleport, Prickwillow and Ely and returns at around 13:30

References

External links
 Black Horse Drove Community web site

Hamlets in Cambridgeshire
East Cambridgeshire District